Jana Škoļina (born 2 November 1990) is a Latvian singer-songwriter who has appeared on the TV programs Latvijas Talants and season 9 of Deutschland sucht den Superstar.

Biography

Early life
Škoļina was born in Ludza, Latvia. She began playing violin and piano at age six, and attended music school in Ludza. Škoļina then moved to Riga, where she continued to study music at the Jazepa Medina Rigas Muzikas Vidusskola.

In 2006 she auditioned for the second season of the Latvian show Latvijas Talants, advanced to the final and finished second in the superfinal. Škoļina moved to London to attend The Institute of Contemporary Music Performance, studying vocal and stage performance.

Deutschland sucht den Superstar
During her first appearance on Deutschland sucht den Superstar, Škoļina (one of 35,401 candidates to audition for the season) sang two songs: "Hallelujah" accompanying herself on the piano and "A Night Like This". The jury allowed her to advance.

In the recall, Škoļina performed with three other candidates: Mercia Okemba, Alexandra Pauna and Anna Zafarian, singing Alexandra Stan's "Mr. Saxobeat". Out of 120 candidates, she was one of 31 to advance to the next recall in the Maldives. There, Škoļina performed several songs (including "Pata Pata", originally recorded by Miriam Makeba) with Isabelle Kessel and Liza-Marie Viebrock. The head of the jury (songwriter, TV personality and lead singer of Modern Talking Dieter Bohlen) said, "Today I see smaller breasts, but  hear a bigger voice".

One of Škoļina's performance was a duet with Marcel Porfumo of "You're Beautiful", co-written and recorded by James Blunt. The jury again noted her singing as well as her looks, and it was considered among her best performances. After this performance, it was rumored that Škoļina and Porfumo had had an affair after a rumored flirtation between her and Luca Hänni in the Maldives.

For her last Maldives performance Škoļina chose the Lady Gaga song "You and I", and was one of 15 candidates chosen to perform before a live TV audience. On the live show, telecast by RTL Television, Škoļina performed Katy Perry's "The One That Got Away". With 3.21 percent of the vote, she placed 12th of the 15 finalists.

Performances

Singles

References

External links
 Facebook
 Promiflash
 RTL Media

1990 births
People from Ludza
Deutschland sucht den Superstar participants
Living people
19 Recordings artists
21st-century Latvian women singers
Latvian songwriters